BIPSS may refer to:

 Bangladesh Institute of Peace and Security Studies, a think tank on Southeast Asian issues
 Bilateral inferior petrosal sinus sampling, a procedure to help distinguish types of Cushing's disease